Zbigniew Michał Chmielowiec (born 22 September 1954 in Kolbuszowa) is a Polish politician. He was elected to the Polish lower house (Sejm) on 25 September 2005, getting 17243 votes in 23 Rzeszów district as a candidate from the Law and Justice list.

References

See also
Members of Polish Sejm 2005-2007

1954 births
Living people
People from Kolbuszowa
Law and Justice politicians
Members of the Polish Sejm 2005–2007
Members of the Polish Sejm 2007–2011
Members of the Polish Sejm 2011–2015
Members of the Polish Sejm 2015–2019
Members of the Polish Sejm 2019–2023